Haynesville is an unincorporated community in southern Clinton County, in the U.S. state of Missouri. The community lies about one quarter mile east of I-35 and north of Missouri Route PP. The community of Holt is located approximately two miles to the southwest on the west side of I-35 in northern Clay County.

History
Haynesville was platted in 1842 and named after Collet Haynes, an early settler. A post office called Hainesville was established in 1843. The spelling was changed to Haynesville in 1880 and the post office closed in 1881.

References

Unincorporated communities in Clinton County, Missouri
Unincorporated communities in Missouri